Anthony “World Number Two” Igwe (born 24 December 1945) is a Nigerian footballer. He competed in the men's tournament at the 1968 Summer Olympics.

References

External links
 

1945 births
Living people
Nigerian footballers
Nigeria international footballers
Olympic footballers of Nigeria
Footballers at the 1968 Summer Olympics
People from Plateau State
Association football defenders